The 12Z, designated Type 89 by the company, was the final evolution of the series of Hispano-Suiza V-12 aircraft engines. The Z model had just entered production when France fell to the Germans during World War II. A small number were produced during the war but the German occupation government would not allow full-scale production to start. After the war small numbers were built to equip new designs, but the rapid introduction of the jet engine ended further development.

Design and development
The 12Z differed from the earlier 12Y primarily in the use of four valves per cylinder operated by dual overhead cams, as opposed to two valves operated by a single camshaft. This gave the cylinders considerably better volumetric efficiency and faster operation, raising the RPM from 2,400 to 2,700. The engine was also designed to run only on 100 octane fuel (instead of 87, which was common at that point) which allowed the compression ratio to rise from the 12Y's 5.8:1 to the 12Z's 6.75:1. These changes raised the power from 1,000 to 1,300 hp (750 to 970 kW) at sea level.

The engine continued to use a single-stage, single-speed supercharger and therefore lacked the all-altitude performance of German and British designs.

Small prototype runs started in 1939, and were fitted to the French Air Force's front-line fighter aircraft, the M.S.410 and D.520, creating the M.S.450 and D.524 respectively. Production of the main model, the 12Z-17, was just starting at the time of the armistice. Production was undertaken in Hispano-Suiza's Spanish factories where they were intended for the Hispano Aviación HA-1112 - only a few were ever used, however, because of mechanical problems with the engine.

After the war a new version tuned to operate with 92 octane fuel, as opposed to the -17's 100/130, was built in limited numbers as the 12Z-89. Compression ratio was raised slightly to 7:1, but with the lower grade fuel the power dropped slightly to 1,280 hp (950 kW) at 2,600 rpm (1,479 hp (1,100 kW) maximum take-off). These engines apparently had the same sorts of reliability issues as the earlier -17's made in Spain, and the type never entered production.

Variants
12Z-1
The initial version of the engine used for development
12Z-17
development peak at time of the Fall of France in May 1940
12Z-89
post-war development, not successful.

Applications
 Arsenal VB 10 
 Breguet 482
 Hispano Aviación HA-1112
 Ikarus S-49C

Specifications (12Z-1)

See also

References

External links

"Hispano Suiza 12B" a 1949 Flight article

1930s aircraft piston engines
Hispano-Suiza aircraft engines